The UMass Minutemen ice hockey statistical leaders are individual statistical leaders of the UMass Minutemen ice hockey program in various categories, including goals, assists, points, and saves. Within those areas, the lists identify single-game, single-season, and career leaders. The Minutemen represent the University of Massachusetts Amherst in the NCAA's Hockey East.

UMass began competing in intercollegiate ice hockey in 1908.  These lists are updated through the end of the 2020–21 season.

Goals

Assists

Points

Saves

References

Lists of college ice hockey statistical leaders by team
Statistical